Tutilawa is a town in Chatra district of Jharkhand, India.

Geography
It is located at an elevation of 592 m above MSL.

Location
National Highway 100 passes through Tutilawa. The nearest airport is Ranchi Airport.

Tutilawa Fair
Tutilawa Mela, started in 1935, is one of the famous cattle fairs of Jharkhand, held on Falgun Poornima.

References

External links
 Satellite map of Tutilawa
 About Tutilawa
 About Tutilawa Mela

Cities and towns in Chatra district